Waszkiewicz is a Polish surname. Notable people with it include:

Adam Waszkiewicz (born 1993), Polish football player
 Aleksander Waszkiewicz (1901–1945), Soviet military officer of Polish descent
 Daniel Waszkiewicz (born 1957), Polish handball player
 Eugeniusz Waszkiewicz (1890–1972), Polish sports shooter, competitor in the 1924 Summer Olympics
 Jan Waszkiewicz (1944–2021), Polish politician, regional official, and academic
 Olga Vashkevich (born 1988), Belarusian basketball player

Polish-language surnames